Stefan Warg (born February 6, 1990) is a Swedish professional ice hockey defenceman currently playing for HC Sparta Praha in the Czech Extraliga (ELH). Warg was selected by the Anaheim Ducks in the 5th round (143rd overall) of the 2008 NHL Entry Draft.

Playing career
Warg attended Anaheim's 2008 training camp, but on September 26, 2008 he was assigned to play in the Western Hockey League (WHL) with the Seattle Thunderbirds.

During his second WHL season, Warg was traded from Seattle to the Prince Albert Raiders. At the end of the season he returned to Sweden to play professionally in the HockeyAllsvenskan with Örebro HK.

Warg signed with Vasteras HK in the Allsvenskan for the 2012–13 season.

At the start of the 2013–14 season Warg returned to North American to play for Anaheim's American Hockey League affiliate, the Norfolk Admirals, however after being demoted to the Utah Grizzlies of the ECHL, Warg and the Anaheim Ducks mutually terminated his contract and he returned Sweden, signing with Skelleftea AIK of the Swedish Hockey League.

Career statistics

References

External links

1990 births
Living people
Anaheim Ducks draft picks
Djurgårdens IF Hockey players
KooKoo players
Malmö Redhawks players
Norfolk Admirals players
Örebro HK players
Prince Albert Raiders players
Seattle Thunderbirds players
Skellefteå AIK players
HC Sparta Praha players
Swedish ice hockey defencemen
Utah Grizzlies (ECHL) players
VIK Västerås HK players
Ice hockey people from Stockholm